The Paideia School of Tampa Bay is a private, classical Christian school serving grades K - 12, located in Tampa, Florida, United States. "Paideia" is the Koine Greek word for "education". The school's stated goal is to use classical education techniques, based on a traditional Christian philosophy, to teach logical thinking, elegant speech, and persuasive writing.

Academics 

The school teaches using a classical Christian education model with a strong emphasis on integrating Christianity into all of its academics.  The school's educational model consists of three stages, divided by grade. In grades K-6, students are considered to be in the "grammar" stage, in which the educational focus is placed on memorizing facts. In grades 7–9, students are said to be in the "dialectic" stage, which focuses on teaching students analytical skills.  Lastly, in grades 10–12, teaching focuses on philosophy and rhetoric, with the goal being to produce a person adept at speaking well and knowledgeably.

Of note is the statistically high number of students in this school to receive national merit scholarships. Two out of three of Paideia's class of 2012 received National Merit Finalist status, an award given only to the top .01% of scorers on the PSAT.

Memberships and affiliations 
 Association of Classical Christian Schools
 Educational Records Bureau

Sources 
 The Paideia School
 The Association of Classical and Christian Schools
 GreatSchools.Net

References

2005 establishments in Florida
Christian schools in Florida
Classical Christian schools
Educational institutions established in 2005
High schools in Tampa, Florida
Private elementary schools in Florida
Private high schools in Florida
Private middle schools in Florida